The 2013 Samford Bulldogs football team represented Samford University in the 2013 NCAA Division I FCS football season. They were led by seventh year head coach Pat Sullivan and played their home games at Seibert Stadium. They were a member of the Southern Conference. They finished the season 8–5, 6–2 in SoCon play to share the conference title with Chattanooga and Furman. They received an at-large bid to the FCS Playoffs where they lost in the first round to Jacksonville State.

Schedule

Ranking movements

References

Samford
Samford Bulldogs football seasons
Southern Conference football champion seasons
Samford
Samford Bulldogs football